Josef Berger (born July 24, 1949 in Varnsdorf) is a Czech scientist. He 
is a full professor at the University of South Bohemia, České Budějovice, Czech Republic. His areas are biomodel development and information gaining.

Career
Berger is a graduate of the Charles University in Prague, Faculty of Science (MSc 1973, RNDr 1979, PhD 1984). He worked as a scientist and professor at the Institute for Pharmacy and Biochemistry, University Hospital in Hradec Králové, University of Pardubice, Masaryk University in Brno. He is a (co)author of 16 books, about 100 scientific papers (original articles and reviews), three hundred popular-science articles and the first Czech University ranking (2007). He prepared the strategy for the University Pardubice foundation (1989-1992), initiated the first Czech bachelor programme in clinical biology (University of Pardubice, 1992), the first Czech master programme in clinical biology (University of South Bohemia, 1998. He also was elected member of the main board of Czechoslovak Biological Society (1997-2000, 2000-2003, 2003–2006) and the Editor-in-Chief of the international Journal of Applied Biomedicine.

Personal life
Berger is married with two sons.

Bibliography

Selected books
J. Berger: Informatika v klinické praxi pro lékaře a klinické biology. Grada/Avicenum 1993. .
J. Berger: Advances in Cell and Molecular Biology. Kopp Publ. 2005. .

References

External links
 Detailed biography (in English)

1949 births
Living people
Biomedical engineers
Czech bioengineers
Academic staff of Masaryk University
People from Varnsdorf
Academic staff of the University of South Bohemia